Ruby Ray (born 1952) is a photographer, particularly known for her photography of the early punk movement. She is known for her photography of marginalized and fringe musical artists, with her photographs featured in Dead Kennedys: Fresh Fruit for Rotting Vegetables, The Early Years.

Career 
Ruby Ray grew up in upstate New York before moving to San Francisco. She began her photography career in 1977 with Search and Destroy, a local San Francisco zine. Her first photo session was with The Dils. By 1979, Search and Destroy has ceased publishing, but Ruby Ray continued photographing local punk bands and eventually began her own publication, RE/Search.

As the punk scene dwindled, Ruby Ray moved to New York City in the 1980s.

Exhibits 
 Punk Passage San Francisco First Wave Punk 1977–1981. San Francisco Public Library. 12 September – 6 December 2009.

References

Publications

Ray, Ruby and Savage, Jon. From the Edge of the World: California Punk,  1977–1981. San Francisco, Calif. : Superior Viaduct, 2013.

Ruby Ray: Kalifornia Kool
Photographs 1976–1982
https://www.artbook.com/9789198451238.html

American photographers
1952 births
Living people
20th-century American women photographers
20th-century American photographers
21st-century American women

Women in punk